The Nokia 7110 is a GSM mobile phone announced in February 1999 and released in October 1999.
It was the first mobile phone to run Series 40 and to come with a WAP browser.

It was preceded by the Nokia 8146/8148 which was released in 1996 and it was replaced by the Nokia 7650 which was released in Late 2001.

Variants
The Nokia 71** series of mobile phones in general featured a special, "navi-roller", a pushable scroll wheel button for quicker scrolling and selection. It was considered to be one of the first true media phones with WAP and messaging capabilities.
 7110 GSM 900/1800 Band Worldwide
 7190 GSM 1900 Band for USA/Canada
 7160 TDMA

Features

The 7110 was Nokia's second handset with a sliding cover that could be used to answer and terminate voice calls. As with the 8110 before, with the cover deployed, the microphone was brought closer to the user's mouth, improving the clarity of the voice reception. New to the 7110 was a spring-powered release mechanism, which would release the cover when a small metal catch on the rear of the handset was depressed. The cover could also be opened manually.

Connectivity is provided via a standard IrDA transceiver on the top edge of the handset. A serial cable can also be attached to the handset's expansion terminal, to allow synchronization of the phone's contents, and to allow the phone to function as a Modem. Data capabilities are limited to circuit switched data; GPRS was not available on this handset. The WAP mini-browser established a connection to the internet using CSD.

The navi-roller was used in place of the familiar up and down buttons, allowing the user to rapidly scroll through lists of options; depressing the roller selected the currently highlighted option.

The 7110 was the first cellular phone to implement the T9 Predictive text input method for composing SMS messages, but the 3210 was the first phone to combine both T9 and internal antenna.

Contrary to popular myth, although the Nokia 7110 does feature a spring-loaded cover concealing the keypad; this is not the model featured in the first Matrix movie, which is the Nokia 8110 (made three years prior), which was adapted with a spring mechanism to feature in the 1999 film.

External links
 Mirror of Nokia 7110 stuff @ filibeto.org / archive.org

References

7110
Mobile phones with infrared transmitter
Mobile phones with user-replaceable battery
Slider phones